Kabuni is a traditional Albanian dessert. It is made of rice fried in butter, mutton broth (ram's neck only), raisins (rinsed first in warm water), and some salt. It is then boiled before sugar, cinnamon, and ground cloves are added. It is served cold.

See also
 List of desserts

References

Desserts
Albanian cuisine